Mount Redfield is a mountain located in Essex County, New York. 
The mountain is part of the Marcy Group of the Great Range of the Adirondack Mountains.
Mount Redfield is flanked to the northwest by Cliff Mountain, and to the northeast by Mount Skylight.

Verplanck Colvin (1847–1920) named Mount Redfield for William C. Redfield (1789–1857), organizer and member of the first expedition to Mount Marcy in 1837, and the first to guess that Marcy was the highest peak in the Adirondacks, and therefore in New York.

Mount Redfield stands within the watershed of the Opalescent River, a tributary of the Hudson River, which in turn drains into New York Bay.
The northeast and north sides of Mt. Redfield drain into Uphill Brook, thence into the Opalescent River.
The west end of Redfield drains into Upper Twin Brook, thence into the Opalescent River.
The south side of Redfield drains into Skylight Brook, thence into Dudley Brook and the Opalescent River.

Mount Redfield is within the High Peaks Wilderness Area of Adirondack State Park.

See also 
 List of mountains in New York
 Northeast 111 4,000-footers
 Adirondack High Peaks
 Adirondack Forty-Sixers

References

External links 
 

Mountains of Essex County, New York
Adirondack High Peaks
Mountains of New York (state)